Doug Searl (born 22 March 1947) is a former Australian rules footballer who played with Fitzroy and Collingwood in the Victorian Football League (VFL).

Searl started his career with Collingwood in 1966 and played mostly as a centre half-forward. He spent two and a bit seasons at Collingwood, including playing in the 1966 VFL Grand Final, which Collingwood lost to St Kilda by one point. During the 1968 VFL season Searl crossed to Fitzroy and had an immediate impact as a forward, kicking 31 goals in his eight games that year. In 1969, Searl topped Fitzroy's goalkicking with 68 goals which was the fourth most in the VFL that season and the best tally by a Fitzroy player in over three decades. He spent the rest of his career as a centre half back, playing his last game in 1976.

Searl continued to be involved in football as a coach and steered the Fitzroy under-19 team to the 1982 premiership.  Searl then went on to coach Richmond under 19s for six seasons claiming two premierships in 1985 and 1989.

In 1991 and 1992 Searl coached Port Melbourne Football Club in the Victorian Football Association (VFA).

Searl's father Sid Searl played for Richmond and Port Melbourne in the 1940s, kicking 12 goals on debut, against Sandringham Football Club before being dropped the next week.

References

Sources
 Atkinson, G. (1982) Everything you ever wanted to know about Australian rules football but couldn't be bothered asking, The Five Mile Press: Melbourne. .

External links

1947 births
Collingwood Football Club players
Fitzroy Football Club players
Port Melbourne Football Club coaches
Australian rules footballers from Victoria (Australia)
Living people